Barysaw District (Barysawski rajon) is a district of Minsk Region, Belarus. Its capital is the town of Barysaw.

Notable residents 
Ivan Yermachenka (1894–1970), Belarusian politician, diplomat and writer

References

External links

 
Districts of Minsk Region